Heliamphora arenicola is a species of marsh pitcher plant known only from the western side of the Ilu–Tramen Massif in Venezuela's Gran Sabana, where it grows at elevations of less than 2000 m. It may also occur on Karaurin Tepui.

References

Further reading

 AIPC Special Issue 4: News of 2011. Associazione Italiana Piante Carnivore.
 Nerz, J. (December 2004). Heliamphora elongata (Sarraceniaceae), a new species from Ilu-Tepui. Carnivorous Plant Newsletter 33(4): 111–116. 
  Nerz, J. (2014). Die Jagd nach Heliamphora ionasi, früher und heute. Das Taublatt 79: 46–65.
 Wistuba, A., T. Carow & P. Harbarth (September 2002). Heliamphora chimantensis, a new species of Heliamphora (Sarraceniaceae) from the ‘Macizo de Chimanta’ in the south of Venezuela. Carnivorous Plant Newsletter 31(3): 78–82. 

arenicola
Flora of Venezuela
Plants described in 2011
Flora of the Tepuis